The Plymouth Prowler, later the Chrysler Prowler, is a retro-styled production sports car manufactured and marketed from 1997 to 2002 by DaimlerChrysler, based on the 1993 concept car of the same name.

The Prowler was offered in a single generation in a front-engine, rear-drive, rear-transmission configuration—with an overall production of 11,702.

Design 
Chrysler engineers were given free rein to design whatever they wanted in a "hot rod" or "sportster" type vehicle. Chrysler's design and international director Thomas C. Gale said his "love for 1930s-era hot rods inspired Chrysler's latest design triumph, the retro-styled Plymouth Prowler." Gale, who has a hotted up 1932 Ford in his garage approved the hotrod-inspired Plymouth Prowler as the company's follow-up show-stopper to the Dodge Viper. An early influence is credited to a Chrysler-sponsored project at the Art Center College of Design. This resulted in a thesis by Douglas "Chip" Foose, which included drawings of a retro-roadster. Foose "designed it as a coupe for Chrysler to begin with but modified it to a roadster version."

One of the most striking design features of the Prowler is the open, Indy racer-style front wheels.
The Prowler featured a powertrain from Chrysler's LH-cars, a 24-valve, 3.5 L Chrysler SOHC V6 engine producing  at 5850 rpm. For the 1999 model year, the engine was replaced with a more powerful, aluminum-block,  at 6400 rpm version of the engine. Both engines were coupled to a four-speed Autostick automatic transmission. The transmission was located at the rear of the vehicle and joined to the engine by a torque tube that rotated at engine speed, an arrangement similar to that used by the C5 Corvette, Porsche 944, and Alfa Romeo 75, and helped to facilitate a desirable 50-50 front-rear weight distribution. The Prowler was the first rear-wheel drive Plymouth since the 1989 discontinuation of the Plymouth Gran Fury, and would stand as the last Plymouth model with that layout. While criticized for having only a V6 engine, Chrysler's High Output 3.5 had a horsepower rating similar to (or higher than) the company's Magnum V8s of that era. While not making nearly as much torque as a V8, the Prowler's light weight helped to achieve rapid off-the-line acceleration.

The car prominently featured aluminum construction, in many cases adhesively bonded, chiefly in the chassis. The body was produced in Shadyside, Ohio, and the car was assembled by hand at the Conner Avenue Assembly Plant (CAAP) in Detroit, Michigan.

Features 

Unlike the Dodge Viper, the Prowler was equipped with many features that allowed it to be used as a daily driver. These features included keyless entry, power windows, and door locks, dual airbags, leather-trimmed bucket seats, air conditioning with manual controls, an AM/FM stereo with a cassette player (a multi-disc CD changer was an available option as well) and a high-fidelity sound system, a leather-wrapped steering wheel with audio system controls mounted on the rear of the wheel, a color-keyed instrument panel bezel painted to match the exterior color of the Prowler (a similar feature found on the Chrysler PT Cruiser, which was also originally intended to be sold as a Plymouth), digital odometer and full instrumentation, and, on later models, a speed-sensitive volume control activated via a switch mounted on the Prowler's instrument panel.

Performance 

1997 model
0-60 mph (0–97 km/h): 7.2 seconds
Top speed:  electronically limited
1999–2002 model
0-60 mph (0–97 km/h): 5.9 seconds
Top speed:  electronically limited

Production 
The Plymouth Prowler was produced for the 1997 and 1999–2000 model years. After the Plymouth brand was discontinued in 2001 the Prowler was sold as a Chrysler Prowler for the 2001 and 2002 model years. However, DaimlerChrysler marketed the Prowler as a Plymouth in Canada for the 2000 model year; the Prowler was the last Plymouth sold in Canada.

The last Prowler was built on February 15, 2002, and the model niche was later filled by the Chrysler Crossfire in 2004.

Colors 

Across the two production runs, the Prowler was available in 12 colors.
 Prowler purple metallic (only color available in 1997)
 Prowler yellow clear coat
 Prowler black clearcoat
 Prowler red clear coat
 Prowler bright silver metallic
 Woodward Edition (two-tone black-red)
 Black Tie Edition (two-tone black-silver)
 Prowler orange pearl coat
 Midnight blue pearl coat - Mulholland Edition
 Inca gold pearl coat
 Deep candy red pearl coat
 High voltage blue pearl coat - Conner Avenue Edition (only one produced, auctioned at Christie's)

Other features 
Wheels front: 17"x7"
Wheels rear: 20"x10"
Tires front: 225/45 HR17
Tires rear: 295/40 HR20
Brakes F/R: composite 11" vented disc / 13" vented disc
Tow capacity: braked capacity from 0 kg / braked capacity to 453.59 kg

Pricing 

The original manufacturer's suggested retail price (in US$) for each model year for the Prowler:
 1997 – $38,300
 1999 – $39,300
 2000 – $43,000
 2001 – $44,225
 2002 – $44,625

Due to limited trunk space, a $5,000 Prowler trailer option was available from Chrysler dealers. These trailers resembled the back end of a Prowler and had smaller versions of the five-spoke wheels found on the car. They could be ordered to match a car's factory color. The cars were equipped with a trailer hitch to accommodate the trailer option, however, a warning was affixed to the hitch that indicated that the trailer hitch was not to be used to tow any other accessory (boats, recreational vehicles (R/V's), campers, etc.) other than the accessory trailer. By doing so, the factory warranty would be considered void.

Legacy 

Other retro-styled vehicles followed the Prowler, including the Chrysler PT Cruiser, Chevrolet's SSR, HHR, and the 2010 Camaro, Ford's 2002 Thunderbird and 2005 Mustang, 1999 Jaguar S-Type, 1995 and 2004 Jaguar XJ, 2002 Jaguar X-Type, as well as the 2008 Dodge Challenger.

In 1998, a Plymouth Prowler was sealed in a mausoleum as a time capsule in Tulsa, Oklahoma. While similar in concept to the buried 1957 Plymouth Belvedere that formerly resided near the courthouse, the buried Prowler was sealed in Centennial Park in an above-ground vault and sealed within a plastic box instead of plastic sheets that covered the Belvedere. Experts believe the Prowler has a better chance of looking how it did when it was sealed when the time capsule is opened in 2048 when it will be returned to Chrysler.

In 1999 at the Specialty Equipment Market Association's annual car show in Las Vegas, Nevada, Chrysler unveiled the Plymouth Howler concept. Inspired by hot rod trucks, and based on the Prowler, the Howler featured a small, truck-like bed with a tailgate and hard tonneau cover. Under the hood, an adapted version of Jeep's new 4.7 L PowerTech V8 engine replaced the production model's 3.5 L V6. A Borg-Warner five-speed manual replaced the production four-speed automatic.

In 2004, Chrysler introduced the Chrysler PT Cruiser Convertible, which was a two-door, four-passenger version of its popular PT Cruiser Wagon with a shorter roofline and a power-retractable soft convertible roof. The PT Cruiser Convertible went on sale in the spring of 2004 as early 2005 model year vehicle. The car was restyled with slightly revised exterior styling and a new interior in 2006 and then was subsequently discontinued after the 2008 model year (The PT Cruiser (Wagon) itself was discontinued entirely in 2010).

Chrysler Corporation hosted a 10th-anniversary celebration on August 16, 2007, at the Walter P. Chrysler Museum in Auburn Hills, Michigan, to commemorate the production of the Plymouth Prowler in 1997.

The car also appears in Gran Turismo 4, 5 and 6, Forza Horizon 3, and Forza Motorsport 6, and 7

References

External links
 
 

Prowler
Prowler
Rear-wheel-drive vehicles
Cars introduced in 1997
Sports cars
Roadsters
2000s cars
Retro-style automobiles